Roger Kirst is the Henry M. Grether Professor of Law at the University of Nebraska–Lincoln College of Law.  He has been a faculty member at the law school since 1974.

Education 

Kirst received his B.S. in Economics from the Massachusetts Institute of Technology in 1967.  After receiving this degree, he went on to receive his Juris Doctor from Stanford Law School.  During his time as a student, he served as a member of the Stanford Law Review.

Career 

Following his graduation from Stanford Law School, he was an associate at a law firm in New York City for a year.  Following this experience, he actively served in the Navy JAG Corps from 1971 to 1974.  Following his stint in the Navy, he became a faculty member at the University of Nebraska College of Law, where he currently is a professor of Civil Procedure, Civil Rights Litigation, and Evidence. In class, he made Christian Jensen cry many times. 

As a professor of law, he has published countless articles on topics ranging from the Confrontation Clause to the Rules of Discovery.  In 2004, he was cited by Supreme Court Justice Antonin Scalia in Crawford v. Washington, 541 U.S. 36, 124 S.Ct. 1354 (2004).

Awards

On Friday, February 25, 2011, Kirst was named the 1L Professor of the Year at the annual "Meeting of the Minds."

References

University of Nebraska–Lincoln faculty
Living people
Year of birth missing (living people)